Sébastien Pérez may refer to:

Sebastián Pérez (bishop) (died 1593), Spanish Roman Catholic bishop
Sebastián Pérez (footballer, born 1990) Chilean football goalkeeper
Sebastián Pérez (footballer, born 1993), Colombian football midfielder
Sebastián Pérez Bouquet (born 2003), Mexican football midfielder

See also
Sébastien Pérez (born 1973), French football defender